The Ch'undu Line is a non-electrified freight-only railway line of the Korean State Railway in North Korea, connecting Songhak on the Hambuk Line with Ch'undu.

Route 

A yellow background in the "Distance" box indicates that section of the line is not electrified.

References

Railway lines in North Korea
Standard gauge railways in North Korea